The VAK410 (Dutch, "Section 410")  was a Dutch Ultras group associated with AFC Ajax. The name comes from the name of their initial stand in Ajax's home stadium, the Amsterdam Arena.

Background 
VAK410 was founded on 26 January 2001 by fanatic supporters of the club who were tired of being on the waiting list for the already existing hooligan firm F-side. On that day, young Ajacied Karel organized the first meeting of the group's in the Amstel Cup home match against SBV Vitesse in row 114. The match resulted in a 1–2 loss. However, the club took a positive stance towards the initiative to create more of an atmosphere in the North side of the stadium, and so VAK410 was born.

Originally known as the Ajax Ultras, with ajaxultras.nl being the official website, the group relocated to row 415 on 11 February 2001 ahead of the home match against Willem II, right next to the "Away row" for visiting supporters. Ajax' fanzine De Ajax Ster, otherwise known as DAS, reported on the development of the row, despite the low turnout of the ultras during the match. However, two weeks later, on 25 February 2001, the group celebrated its first big success when a large gathering managed to silence the visiting crowd during the home match against FC Utrecht.

The first match in their current location in the stadium, from which they took the name VAK410, was held on 19 August 2001, at which point the group had approximately 400 members. Considered one of the most famous Tifosi groups in the sport, the group considered itself to be an ultra fan group, and it distanced itself from hooliganism.

The group dissolved in the summer of 2016, after disagreements with Ajax Amsterdam's management, over the decision of the club's board to move them away from their years long location at VAK 410 of the Amsterdam Arena.

Incidents 
Since the formation of the group, there have been several incidents that have led to negative press or even to the club being fined. In August 2010, Ajax was fined €10,000 for the group's behavior during a UEFA Europa League away match against Juventus due to severe destruction inside the stadium, the lighting of fireworks, and for injuring an Italian steward in the stadium. Ajax was fined €10,000 once more in 2013 during the UEFA Champions League home match against Manchester City after VAK410 revealed a massive banner showing a crossed out Sheikh holding a bag of money, with the phrase 'Against Modern Football!' under it. UEFA called the banner tasteless and completely unfitting. During the final of the KNVB Cup in 2014, the group sabotaged the match by throwing fireworks onto the pitch in the vicinity of their own goalkeeper. They did this because the final was held in 'De Kuip', the stadium of rival club Feyenoord. The match was stopped twice with Ajax leading 1–0. After resuming the match, Ajax eventually lost 1–5 to PEC Zwolle. The group first stated that throwing fireworks is an inalienable part of such finals. After pressure from authorities and the F-side, the group eventually did apologise for its behaviour in what would get known as the Vuurwerkincident.

Judaism 

Ajax is popularly seen as having "Jewish roots". In the 1970s, supporters of rival teams began taunting Ajax fans by calling them Jews. Ajax fans, few of whom are actually Jewish themselves, countered this by embracing Ajax's "Jewish" identity: calling themselves "super Jews", chanting "Joden, Joden" (Jews, Jews) at games, and adopting Jewish symbols, such as the Star of David and the Israeli flag. This Jewish imagery eventually became a central part of Ajax fans' culture. At one point, ringtones of "Hava Nagila", a Hebrew folk song, could be downloaded from the club's official website. Starting in the 1980s, fans of Ajax' rivals started their antisemitic rhetoric, chanting slogans like "Hamas, Hamas, Jews to the gas" ("Hamas, Hamas, joden aan het gas"), hissing to imitate the flow of gas, giving Nazi salutes, etc. The eventual result was that many (genuinely) Jewish Ajax fans stopped going to games. In the 2000s, the club tried to persuade fans to drop its Jewish image, but to no avail. Supporters, both on and off the pitch, employ imagery associated with Jewish history and the Israeli nation to this day. Tottenham Hotspur's Yid Army use similar symbols.

See also 
North Up Alliance
South Crew
Barra Brava
Casual (subculture)
Curva
Hooliganism
List of hooligan firms
Major football rivalries
Torcida

References

External links
VAK410 Official website

AFC Ajax
Association football hooligan firms
Gangs in the Netherlands
2001 establishments in the Netherlands
2016 disestablishments in the Netherlands